Motjane is a town in northwestern Eswatini. It is located on the MR1 route 15 kilometres to the northwest of Mbabane, on a junction with a route crossing into South Africa near the town of Ngwenya.
It was reported by The Rudolph Aggregates to have a listed population of under 500 inhabitants

References
Fitzpatrick, M., Blond, B., Pitcher, G., Richmond, S., and Warren, M. (2004)  South Africa, Lesotho and Swaziland. Footscray, VIC: Lonely Planet.

Populated places in Eswatini